Dr Uzee Usman Adeyemi (born 11 November 1986),  is a Nigerian actor and film producer known for his film Voiceless, Mustapha and Oga Abuja. His ability for fusing Nollywood  and Kannywood won him several awards and recognitions including Young Entrepreneur of the Year at the 2016 National Heritage Award.

Early life
Uzee Usman Adeyemi hails from Kwara State born & grew up in Kaduna, Kaduna State. He holds two degrees in Political Science and English Language from the University of Abuja and University of Jos respectively before he proceeded to study Special Effects in South Africa.

Career
Dr Uzee Usman began his career in 2003 as a make-up artist. In 2013, he delved into film-making and has produced award winning films, both in Kannywood and Nollywood including Oga Abuja, which won Best Hausa Movie of the Year at the 2013 City People Entertainment Awards; and Maja which won Best Film of the Year (Kannywood) at the 2014 City People Entertainment Awards and was nominated in the Best Picture category at the 2014 Nigeria Entertainment Awards.

In 2021, He was awarded a Honorary Doctorate Degree by iheris University Togo.

Awards
Awards received by Uzee Usman.

Filmography
List of films by Uzee Usman

See also
 List of Nigerian film producers
List of Nigerian actors

References

External links

1986 births
Nigerian film producers
Nigerian film directors
Nigerian male film actors
People from Kaduna
People from Kwara State
University of Jos alumni
University of Abuja alumni
Living people
21st-century Nigerian male actors
Nigerian film award winners
Kannywood actors
Actors from Kwara State
Nigerian television presenters
Nigerian male television actors
20th-century births